This is a list of Hungarian football transfers for the 2022–23 winter transfer window. Only transfers featuring Nemzeti Bajnokság I are listed.

Nemzeti Bajnokság I

Note: Flags indicate national team as has been defined under FIFA eligibility rules. Players may hold more than one non-FIFA nationality.

Ferencváros

In:

Out:

Kisvárda

In:

Out:

Puskás Akadémia

In:

Out:

Fehérvár

In:

Out:

Újpest

In:

Out:

Paks

In:

Out:

Debrecen

In:

Out:

Zalaegerszeg

In:

Out:

Honvéd

In:

Out:

Mezőkövesd

In:

Out:

Vasas

In:

Out:

Kecskemét

In:

Out:

See also
 2022–23 Nemzeti Bajnokság I

References

External links
 Official site of the MLSZ
 Official site of the Nemzeti Bajnokság I

Hungary
Transfers
2022-23